Zola Nakia Davis (born January 16, 1975) is a former American football wide receiver who played one season with the Cleveland Browns of the National Football League. He played college football at the University of South Carolina and attended Burke High School in Charleston, South Carolina. He was also a member of the Green Bay Packers and New York/New Jersey Hitmen.

Early years
Davis played high school football at Burke High School. He was a three-time all-state selection, played wide receiver and defensive back and was rated the No. 1 wide receiver in the nation by SuperPrep his senior year. He also won three letters in football and four in basketball.

College career
Davis played for the South Carolina Gamecocks from 1995 to 1998. He finished his college career with 164 receptions for 2,354 yards and 17 touchdowns. He was inducted into the South Carolina Athletic Hall of Fame in 2014.

Professional career

Green Bay Packers
Davis was signed by the Green Bay Packers on April 23, 1999 after going undrafted in the 1999 NFL Draft. He was released by the Packers on August 30, 1999.

Cleveland Browns
Davis spent the 1999 season with the Cleveland Browns. He played in six games, starting one, while recording 2 receptions for 38 yards. He was released by the Browns on August 22, 2000.

New York/New Jersey Hitmen
Davis played for the New York/New Jersey Hitmen of the XFL in 2001. He recorded 29 receptions for 378 yards and four touchdowns.

References

External links
Just Sports Stats
College stats
Fanbase profile

Living people
1975 births
Players of American football from South Carolina
American football wide receivers
African-American players of American football
South Carolina Gamecocks football players
Cleveland Browns players
New York/New Jersey Hitmen players
Sportspeople from Charleston, South Carolina
21st-century African-American sportspeople
20th-century African-American sportspeople